Tistrella  is a bacterial genus from the family of Rhodospirillaceae. Tistrella produces didemnins.

References

Further reading
 
 

Rhodospirillales
Bacteria genera